The Dawson Car Company was formed in June 1918 by AJ Dawson, previously works manager at Hillman and designer of the 1913 Hillman Nine car and launched in 1919. 

The only car made by the company was the 11-12 hp with a water-cooled, four-cylinder 1795 cc overhead camshaft engine coupled to a three-speed gearbox. It was available in four body styles, most bodied by Charlesworth, and unusually, customers could not buy a chassis only. Most were sold in Dawson Blue with black wings. Final production seems to have been in 1921 after about 65 cars were made.

The Dawson cars were expensive, the cheapest being £600 for the two-seater, and could not compete with Morris and Austin.  Nearly all the components were made in-house. 

In 1921 the Triumph Cycle Company Ltd. bought Dawson's premises and fittings in Clay Lane, Stoke, Coventry but no more of the 11-12 models were made.

See also
 List of car manufacturers of the United Kingdom

References 

Defunct motor vehicle manufacturers of England
Coventry motor companies